The bazooka is a brass musical instrument several feet in length which incorporates telescopic tubing like the trombone. Radio comedian Bob Burns is credited with inventing the instrument in the 1910s, and popularized it in the 1930s. It was also played by jazz musicians Noon Johnson and Sanford Kendrick.

Sound

From its start within a lipreed mouthpiece – which may consist of nothing but the bare tube or may employ a mouthpiece which is handmade to emulate one from a low brass instrument – the air column expands into a wide length of pipe that slides freely around a narrower length of pipe, which, in turn, terminates in a widely flaring bell.

Although the slide action of the bazooka appears to alter pitch, this is not the case due to the extremely wide diameter of the horn's tubing. Manipulating the horn's length changes tone quality as subtle harmonic overtones fluctuate. This effect gives the bazooka its characteristic warbling, echoing sound.

All of the bazooka's notes are produced purely in falset. In other words, the player's lips produce pitches as they vibrate on the bare pipe end or in conjunction with the optional mouthpiece and leadpipe unit, but not in resonance with the full tube length of the instrument. Unlike the trombone, the remainder of the bazooka works mainly as a megaphone to amplify the volume of the sound.

It can be seen being played by Bob Burns in the 1936 movie Rhythm on the Range during the song "I'm an Old Cowhand".

Name
The name "bazooka" comes from an extension of the word "bazoo", which is slang for "mouth" or "boastful talk", and which ultimately probably stems from Dutch bazuin (buisine, a medieval trumpet). The name appears in the 1909 novel The Swoop, or how Clarence Saved England by P. G. Wodehouse, describing a musical instrument used in music halls.

During World War II, "bazooka" became the universally applied nickname of a new American anti-tank weapon, due to its vague resemblance to the musical instrument.

References

External links
 Bob "Bazooka" Burns
  — the inventor explains and demonstrates his instrument

Brass instruments
Bass (sound)